The Scandinavian Mountains or the Scandes is a mountain range that runs through the Scandinavian Peninsula. The western sides of the mountains drop precipitously into the North Sea and Norwegian Sea, forming the fjords of Norway, whereas to the northeast they gradually curve towards Finland. The mountain range just touches northwesternmost Finland but are scarcely more than hills at their northernmost extension at the North Cape.

The Scandinavian Montane Birch forest and grasslands terrestrial ecoregion is closely associated with the mountain range.

Names in Scandinavia
In South Norway there is a broad scatter of mountain regions with individual names, such as Dovrefjell, Hardangervidda, Jotunheimen, and Rondane.

Orography
The mountain chain's highest summits are mostly concentrated in an area (of mean altitude of over 1,000 m) between Stavanger and Trondheim in South Norway, with numerous peaks over 1,300 m and some peaks over 2,000 m. Around Trondheim Fjord, peaks decrease in altitude to about 400–500 m rising again to heights in excess of 1,900 m further north in Swedish Lapland and nearby areas of Norway. The southern part of the mountain range contains the highest mountain of Northern Europe, Galdhøpiggen at almost 2,500 m. This part of the mountain chain is also broader and contains a series of plateaux and gently undulating surfaces that hosts scattered inselbergs. The plateaux and undulating surfaces of the southern Scandinavian Mountains form a series of stepped surfaces. Geomorphologist Karna Lidmar-Bergström and co-workers recognize five widespread stepped surfaces. In eastern Norway, some of the stepped surfaces merge into a single surface.  Dovre and Jotunheimen are rises from the highest of the stepped surfaces. In south-western Norway, the plateaux and gently undulating surfaces are strongly dissected by fjords and valleys. The mountain chain is present in Sweden from northern Dalarna northwards; south of this point the Scandinavian Mountains lie completely within Norway. Most of the Scandinavian Mountains lack "alpine topography", and where present it does not relate to altitude. An example of this is the distribution of cirques in southern Norway that can be found both near sea level and at 2,000 m. Most cirques are found between 1,000 and 1,500 m.

Generally the  do not surpass 1,000 m above sea level. As a geomorphic unit the  extends across Sweden as a 650 km long and 40 to 80 km broad belt from Dalarna in the south to Norrbotten in the north. While lower than the Scandinavian Mountains proper, the 's pronounced relief, its large number of plateaux, and its coherent valley system distinguish it from so-called undulating hilly terrain and plains with residual hills found further east.

Climate, permafrost and glaciers

The climate of the Nordic countries is maritime along the coast of Norway, and much more continental in Sweden in the rain shadow of the Scandinavian Mountains. The combination of a northerly location and moisture from the North Atlantic Ocean has caused the formation of many ice fields and glaciers. In the mountains, the air temperature decreases with increasing altitude, and patches of mountain permafrost in regions with a mean annual air temperature (MAAT) of -1.5 °C will be found at wind exposed sites with little snow cover during winter. Higher up, widespread permafrost may be expected at altitudes with a MAAT of -3.5 °C, continuous permafrost at altitudes with a MAAT of -6.0 °C.

Within the EU-sponsored project PACE (Permafrost and Climate in Europe), a 100 m deep borehole was drilled in bedrock above Tarfala research station at an altitude of 1540 m above sea level. The stable ground temperature at a depth of 100 meters is still -2.75 °C. The measured geothermal gradient in the drillhole of 1.17 °C /100 m allows to extrapolate a permafrost thickness of 330 meters, a further proof that continuous permafrost exists in these altitudes and above, up to the top of Kebnekaise.

In the Scandinavian Mountains, the lower limit of widespread discontinuous permafrost drops from 1700 meters in the west of southern Norway to 1500 meters near the border with Sweden, and from 1600 m in northern Norway to 1100 m in northern, more continental Sweden (Kebnekaise area). In contrast to the lower limit of permafrost, the mean glacier altitude (or glaciation limit) is related to the amount of precipitation. Thus the snow line, or glacier equilibrium line as the limit between the accumulation zone and ablation zone shows the opposite trend, from 1500 meters in the west (Jostefonn) to 2100 meters in the east (Jotunheimen).

Geology

Bedrock

Most of the rocks of the Scandinavian Mountains are Caledonian, which means they were put in place by the Caledonian orogeny. Caledonian rocks overlie rocks of the much older Svecokarelian and Sveconorwegian provinces. The Caledonian rocks actually form large nappes that have been thrust over the older rocks. Much of the Caledonian rocks have been eroded since they were put in place, meaning that they were once thicker and more contiguous. It is also implied from the erosion that the nappes of Caledonian rock once reached further east than they do today. The erosion has left remaining massifs of Caledonian rocks and windows of Precambrian rock.

While there are some disagreements, geologists generally recognize four units among the nappes: an uppermost, an upper, a middle and a lower unit. The lower unit is made up Ediacaran (Vendian), Cambrian, Ordovician and Silurian-aged sedimentary rocks. Pieces of Precambrian shield rocks are in some places also incorporated into the lower nappes.

It was during the Silurian and Devonian periods that the Caledonian nappes were stacked upon the older rocks and upon themselves. This occurred in connection to the closure of the Iapetus Ocean as the ancient continents of Laurentia and Baltica collided. This collision produced a Himalayas-sized mountain range named the Caledonian Mountains roughly over the same area as the present-day Scandinavian Mountains. The Caledonian Mountains began a post-orogenic collapse in the Devonian, implying tectonic extension and subsidence. Despite occurring in about the same area, the ancient Caledonian Mountains and the modern Scandinavian Mountains are unrelated.

Origin

The origin of today's mountain topography is debated by geologists. Geologically, the Scandinavian Mountains are an elevated, passive continental margin similar to the mountains and plateaux found on the opposite side of the North Atlantic in Eastern Greenland or in Australia's Great Dividing Range. The Scandinavian Mountains attained its height by tectonic processes different from orogeny, chiefly in the Cenozoic. A two-stage model of uplift has been proposed for the Scandinavian Mountains in South Norway. A first stage in the Mesozoic and a second stage starting from the Oligocene. The uplift of South Norway has elevated the westernmost extension of the sub-Cambrian peneplain which forms part of what is known as the Paleic surface in Norway. In South Norway, the Scandinavian Mountains had their main uplift phase later (Neogene) than in northern Scandinavia which had its main phase of uplift in the Paleogene. For example, the Hardangervidda uplifted from sea level to its present 1200–1100 m in Early Pliocene times.

The various episodes of uplift of the Scandinavian Mountains were similar in orientation and tilted land surfaces to the east while allowing rivers to incise the landscape. Some of the tilted surfaces constitute the Muddus plains landscape of northern Sweden. The progressive tilt contributed to create the parallel drainage pattern of northern Sweden. Uplift is thought to have been accommodated by coast-parallel normal faults and not by fault-less doming. Therefore, the common labelling of the southern Scandinavian Mountains and the northern Scandinavian Mountains as two domes is misleading. There are divided opinions on the relation between the coastal plains of Norway, the strandflat, and the uplift of the mountains.

Unlike orogenic mountains, there is no widely accepted geophysical model to explain elevated passive continental margins such as the Scandinavian Mountains. Various mechanisms of uplift have, however, been proposed over the years. A 2012 study argues that the Scandinavian Mountains and other elevated passive continental margins most likely share the same mechanism of uplift and that this mechanism is related to far-field stresses in Earth's lithosphere. The Scandinavian Mountains can according to this view be likened to a giant anticlinal lithospheric fold. Folding could have been caused by horizontal compression acting on a thin to thick crust transition zone (as are all passive margins).

Alternative lines of research have stressed the role of climate in inducing erosion that induces an isostatic compensation; fluvial and glacial erosion and incision during the Quaternary is thought to have contributed to the uplift of the mountain by forcing an isostatic response. The total amount of uplift produced by this mechanism could be as much as 500 m. Other geoscientists have implied diapirism in the asthenosphere as being the cause of uplift. One hypothesis states that the early uplift of the Scandinavian Mountains could be indebted to changes in the density of the lithosphere and asthenosphere caused by the Iceland plume when Greenland and Scandinavia rifted apart about 53 million years ago.

Quaternary geology

Many slopes and valleys are straight because they follow tectonic fractures that are more prone to erosion. Another result of tectonics in the relief is that slopes corresponding to footwalls of normal faults tend to be straight.
There is evidence that the drainage divide between the Norwegian Sea and the south-east flowing rivers were once further west. Glacial erosion is thought to have contributed to the shift of the divide, which in some cases ought to have been in excess of 50 km. Much of the Scandinavian Mountains has been sculpted by glacial erosion. The mountain chain is dotted with glacial cirques usually separated from each other by pre-glacial paleosurfaces. Glacier erosion has been limited in these paleosurfaces which form usually plateaus between valleys. As such the paleosurfaces were subject of diverging and slow ice flow during the glaciations. In contrast valleys concentrated ice flow forming fast glaciers or ice streams. At some locations coalesced cirques form arêtes and pyramidal peaks. Glacial reshaping of valleys is more marked in the western part of the mountain chain where drowned glacier-shaped valleys constitute the fjords of Norway. In the eastern part of the mountain chain, glacial reshaping of valleys is weaker. Many mountain tops contain blockfields which escaped glacial erosion either by having been nunataks in the glacial periods or by being protected from erosion under cold-based glacier ice. Karst systems, with their characteristic caves and sinkholes, occur at various places in the Scandinavian Mountains, but are more common in the northern parts. Present-day karst systems might have long histories dating back to the Pleistocene or even earlier.
Much of the mountain range is mantled by deposits of glacial origin including till blankets, moraines, drumlins and glaciofluvial material in the form of outwash plains and eskers. Bare rock surfaces are more common in the western side of the mountain range. Although the ages of these deposits and landforms vary, most of them were formed in connection to the Weichselian glaciation and the subsequent deglaciation.

The Cenozoic glaciations that affected Fennoscandia most likely began in the Scandinavian Mountains. It is estimated that during 50% of the last 2.75 million years the Scandinavian Mountains hosted mountain-centered ice caps and ice fields. The ice fields from which the Fennoscandian Ice Sheet grew out multiple times most likely resembled today's ice fields in Andean Patagonia. During the last glacial maximum (ca. 20 ka BP) all the Scandinavian Mountains were covered by the Fennoscandian Ice Sheet, which extended well beyond the mountains into Denmark, Germany, Poland and the former USSR. As the ice margin started to recede 22–17 ka BP the ice sheet became increasingly concentrated in the Scandinavian Mountains. Recession of the ice margin led the ice sheet to be concentrated in two parts of the Scandinavian Mountains, one part in South Norway and another in northern Sweden and Norway. These two centres were for a time linked, so that the linkage constituted a major drainage barrier that formed various large ephemeral ice-dammed lakes. About 10 ka BP, the linkage had disappeared and so did the southern centre of the ice sheet a thousand years later. The northern centre remained a few hundred years more, and by 9,7 ka BP the eastern Sarek Mountains hosted the last remnant of the Fennoscandian Ice Sheet. As the ice sheet retreated to the Scandinavian Mountains it was dissimilar to the early mountain glaciation that gave origin to the ice sheet as the ice divide lagged behind as the ice mass concentrated in the west.

Highest mountains

Norway

Of the 10 highest mountain peaks in Scandinavia (prominence greater than ), six are situated in Oppland, Norway. The other four are situated in Sogn og Fjordane, Norway.

  Galdhøpiggen (Innlandet)
  Glittertind (Innlandet)
  Store Skagastølstind (Vestland)
  Store Styggedalstinden east (Vestland)
  Skarstind (Innlandet)
  Vesle Galdhøpiggen (Innlandet)
  Surtningssue (Innlandet)
  Store Memurutinden (Innlandet)
  Jervvasstind (Vestland)
  Sentraltind (Vestland)

Sweden
There are 12 peaks in Sweden that reach above , or 13 depending on how the peaks are defined. Eight of them are located in Sarek National Park and the neighbouring national park Stora Sjöfallet. The other four peaks are located in the further north region of Kebnekaise. All mountain names are in Sami but with the more common Swedish spelling of it.

  Kebnekaise (Lappland) – Note: Altitude includes the peak glacier. If melting continues, Kebnekaise Nordtoppen, just 500 meters away, might become the highest point.
  Kebnekaise Nordtoppen (Lappland) – the highest fixed point in Sweden.
  Sarektjåkkå Stortoppen (Lappland)
  Kaskasatjåkka (Lappland)
  Sarektjåkkå Nordtoppen (Lappland)
  Kaskasapakte (Lappland)
  Sarektjåkkå Sydtoppen (Lappland)
  Akka Stortoppen (Lappland)
  Akka Nordvästtoppen (Lappland)
  Sarektjåkkå Buchttoppen (Lappland)
  Pårtetjåkka (Lappland)
  Palkatjåkka (Lappland)

Other popular mountains for skiers, climbers and hikers in Sweden

 Sulitelma 1,860 m (Lappland)
 Helagsfjället 1,796 m (Härjedalen)
 Norra Storfjället 1,767 m (Lappland)
 Templet 1,728 m (Jämtland)
 Lillsylen 1,704 m (Jämtland)
 Åreskutan 1,420 m (Jämtland)
 Storvätteshågna 1,204 m (Dalarna)
 Nipfjället 1,191 m (Dalarna)
 Städjan 1,131 m (Dalarna)

Finland

 1,324 m (4,344 ft) Halti (Lappi/Lapland and Norwegian Troms)
 1,317 m (4,321 ft) Ridnitsohkka (Lappi/Lapland)
 1,280 m (4,200 ft) Kiedditsohkka (Lappi/Lapland)
 1,240 m (4,068 ft) Kovddoskaisi (Lappi/Lapland)
 1,239 m (4,065 ft) Ruvdnaoaivi (Lappi/Lapland)
 1,180 m (3,871 ft) Loassonibba (Lappi/Lapland)
 1,150 m (3,773 ft) Urtasvaara (Lappi/Lapland)
 1,144 m (3,753 ft) Kahperusvaarat (Lappi/Lapland)
 1,130 m (3,707 ft) Aldorassa (Lappi/Lapland)
 1,100 m (3,608 ft) Kieddoaivi (Lappi/Lapland)

See also

Dovrefjell
Jotunheimen

Notes

References

External links

 
Mountain ranges of Europe
Mountain ranges of Norway
Mountain ranges of Finland
Mountain ranges of Sweden
Scandinavia